Manita Devkota is a Nepalese-born American model, women's health advocate, and beauty pageant titleholder who was crowned Miss Universe Nepal on April 11, 2018, representing Nepal at the Miss Universe 2018 pageant, finishing as a Top 10 finalist. She became the first Miss Nepal to win Miss Universe Nepal in an ongoing competition, as the organizer of Miss Nepal; The Hidden Treasure adjoined the title for the first time in the competition. At the 67th Miss Universe pageant held on December 17, 2018, at the Impact arena, Muang Thong Thani in Nonthaburi Province, the northern suburb of Bangkok, represented Nepal. She also won the Miss Universe National Gift Auction of 2018. She is also a Nepalese health care worker.

Miss Universe 2018
On December 17, 2018, Devkota participated in Miss Universe 2018 at the Impact arena. Nepal debuted in the Miss Universe pageantry in 2017 In the second year of participation, Devkota made it to the top 10. She became the first Miss Nepal to enter the Semi-Final in Miss Universe.

References 

Living people
Miss Nepal winners
American people of Nepalese descent
Nepalese emigrants to the United States
Nepalese beauty pageant winners
Miss Universe 2018 contestants
Nepalese health activists
People from Gorkha District
Khas people
Year of birth missing (living people)